The 1952 United States presidential election in New Mexico took place on November 4, 1952. All 48 States were part of the 1952 United States presidential election. State voters chose four electors to represent them in the Electoral College, which voted for President and Vice President.

New Mexico was won by World War II hero and supreme allied commander Dwight D. Eisenhower by a wide 11 percentage point margin. Running against Eisenhower was Governor of Illinois Adlai Stevenson, who carried only the majority of the American South during his two runs for the presidency. This was the tenth consecutive U.S. Presidential Election which New Mexico participated in.

Results

Results by county

References

New Mexico
1952 New Mexico elections
1952